The  Italian law codes constitute the codified law of Italy.

History
There used to be only five codes of Italian law: the civil code, the code of civil procedure, the penal code, the code of criminal procedure, and the navigation code. 
Starting from Eighties, more specific subject were needed and specific codes were created to better codify the law.

The civil codes
The codice civile represents private law. The first civil code was enacted in 1865.

The civil code also outlines the laws for commerce and is the code dealing with corporate law.

Code of civil procedure
This code contains the rules for civil proceedings before a court of law.

Penal code
The Penal Code (Codice Penale) has its origins in Roman law and in Middle Ages canonical law, although the Code in its current state was written during the French Enlightenment.

Code of criminal procedure
Code of Criminal Procedure

Navigation code
The  is the principal set of rules governing the internal states and situations of sea and air navigation. It was approved originally during 1942, and subsequently amended 2005 and 2006.

See also
Law and criminal justice of Italy

Bibliography 
 . URL archived on July 15, 2019

References

Criminal codes
Law of Italy